Kuberski (feminine: Kuberska; plural: Kuberscy) is a surname. Notable people with the surname include:

 Bob Kuberski (born 1971), American football player
 Steve Kuberski (born 1947), American basketball player

Polish-language surnames